Athyrium (lady-fern) is a genus of about 180 species of terrestrial ferns, with a cosmopolitan distribution.  It is placed in the family Athyriaceae, in the order Polypodiales.
Its genus name is from Greek a- ('without') and Latinized Greek thyreos ('shield'), describing its inconspicuous indusium (sorus' covering).
The common name "lady fern" refers in particular to the common lady fern, Athyrium filix-femina.

Athyrium species are used as food plants by the larvae of some Lepidoptera species including the small angle shades and Sthenopis auratus.

Species
There are about 180, including:

References

External links

Flora of China
Flora Europaea
Flora of North America

 
Fern genera